Lydeard St Lawrence or St Lawrence Lydiard is a village and civil parish in Somerset, England, situated  north west of Taunton in the Somerset West and Taunton district.  The village has a population of 506. The parish includes the hamlets of Westowe, Hoccombe and Pyleigh, with its 16th century manor house.

History
The Lydeard part of the name is believed to be a corruption of Lidegaard from the Celtic garth meaning ridge and Old English led meaning grey. The second part of the village name is taken from the dedication of the church.

From Saxon times the manor was owned by the Bishop of Winchester as part of their Taunton Deane estate. After the Norman Conquest it was granted to Wilward by William the conqueror and known as Pylegh. The parish of Lydeard St Lawrence was part of the Taunton Deane Hundred.

In the 18th century the manor was acquired by the Hancock family.

Governance
The parish council has responsibility for local issues, including setting an annual precept (local rate) to cover the council’s operating costs and producing annual accounts for public scrutiny. The parish council evaluates local planning applications and works with the local police, district council officers, and neighbourhood watch groups on matters of crime, security, and traffic. The parish council's role also includes initiating projects for the maintenance and repair of parish facilities, as well as consulting with the district council on the maintenance, repair, and improvement of highways, drainage, footpaths, public transport, and street cleaning. Conservation matters (including trees and listed buildings) and environmental issues are also the responsibility of the council.

The village falls within the non-metropolitan district of Somerset West and Taunton, which was established on 1 April 2019. It was previously in the district of Taunton Deane, which was formed on 1 April 1974 under the Local Government Act 1972, and part of Taunton Rural District before that. The district council is responsible for local planning and building control, local roads, council housing, environmental health, markets and fairs, refuse collection and recycling, cemeteries and crematoria, leisure services, parks, and tourism.

Somerset County Council is responsible for running the largest and most expensive local services such as education, social services, libraries, main roads, public transport, policing and  fire services, trading standards, waste disposal and strategic planning.

It is also part of the Taunton Deane county constituency represented in the House of Commons of the Parliament of the United Kingdom. It elects one Member of Parliament (MP) by the first past the post system of election.

Religious sites
The parish Church of St Lawrence dates from 1350 and has been designated as a Grade I listed building. It was granted to Taunton Priory by Simon de Florey in the late 12th century with the patronage later being held by the Portman family during the 17th and 18th centuries.

Notable residents
 Thomas Manton (1620–1677) an English Puritan clergyman was born in the village.
 John Venn (1586 – 28 June 1650) Politician and soldier. Signed the death warrant of Charles I.
 Henry Wolcott (6 December 1578 – 30 May 1655) Emigrant to Windsor, Hartford, Connecticut, sailing on "The Mary and John" to Boston in 1630. Grandfather of Gov. Roger Wolcott, and greatgrandfather of Gov. Oliver Wolcott.

Less notable residents
Thomas Benet, clerk, suffered the cutting down & removal of trees from his land in Lydeyerde St Laurence, in 1396.

References

External links

Villages in Taunton Deane
Civil parishes in Somerset